José Martín de Aldehuela (5 November 1729 – 7 September 1802) was a Spanish architect, born in Manzanera, in Teruel Province, Aragon.

Cathedral
He was called upon by the bishop of Málaga, Molina Larios, to complete the reconstruction on the city's cathedral.

He arrived in the city in 1778, directed the reconstruction, and also undertook many smaller projects on churches and  architecture within the city such as the aqueduct of San Telmo, which was of monumental importance to the water supply in Malaga.

Puente Nuevo
In 1793, outside of the city, he completed the Puente Nuevo ("New Bridge") of Ronda, that was originally started in 1759 but remained unfinished. This became one of his best-known works.

He also designed the Plaza de Toros de Ronda, one of the oldest bullrings still in use.

References

1729 births
1802 deaths
People from Gúdar-Javalambre
18th-century Spanish architects
History of Málaga